The 2020–21 season was the 124th season of competitive football by Heart of Midlothian (Hearts), with the team participating in the Scottish Championship. It was the club's first season of play in the second tier of Scottish football since 2015, and only the second since 1983, having been relegated from the Scottish Premiership, after the previous season was ended early due to the COVID-19 pandemic in Scotland. On 10 April 2021, Hearts earned automatic promotion back to the Scottish Premiership, having been in first place for most of the season. They also competed in this season's Scottish League Cup and Scottish Cup, losing in the second round of each competition respectively.

Hearts had reached the semi-finals of the 2019–20 Scottish Cup before the COVID-19 pandemic stopped all football activity in Scotland during the previous season. Their semi-final against Hibs, which was originally due to be played in April, was rescheduled to take place later in the year. Hearts played the rearranged fixture against Hibs on 31 October, winning 2–1. On 20 December, they lost the 2020 Scottish Cup Final to Celtic in a penalty shootout following a 3–3 draw after extra time.

Results and fixtures

Pre-season / Friendlies

Championship

Due to COVID-19 restrictions in Scotland forcing an October start to the Scottish Championship season, the length of the league was reduced from thirty-six to twenty-seven games. The fixture list for the truncated Championship was announced on 29 July, starting with a home game against Dundee.

League Cup

Hearts were drawn into Group A of the League Cup group stage, alongside Cowdenbeath, East Fife  Inverness Caledonian Thistle and Raith Rovers.

Scottish Cup

First team player statistics

Captains
Steven Naismith continued as captain for the 2020–21 season, having been appointed to the role during the previous season.
{| class="wikitable" style="font-size: 95%; text-align: center;"
|-
! style="background:maroon; color:white;" scope="col" width=60|No
! style="background:maroon; color:white;" scope="col" width=60|Pos
! style="background:maroon; color:white;" scope="col" width=60|Country
! style="background:maroon; color:white;" scope="col" width=150|Name
! style="background:maroon; color:white;" scope="col" width=80|No of games
! style="background:maroon; color:white;" scope="col" width=80|Notes
|-
|14||FW||||Naismith||14||Captain
|-
|1|||GK||||Gordon||11||Vice Captain
|-
|5|||DF||||Haring||1||Vice Captain
|-
|6|||DF||||Berra||4||Vice Captain
|-
|26|||DF||||Halkett||5||Vice Captain

Squad information
During the 2020–21 campaign, Hearts used thirty-one players in competitive games. The table below shows the number of appearances and goals scored by each player.
Last Updated 30 April 2021

{| class="wikitable sortable" style="font-size: 100%; text-align: center;"
|-
! style="background:maroon; color:white;" scope="col" rowspan="2" width="10%" align="center"|Number
! style="background:maroon; color:white;" scope="col" rowspan="2" width="10%" align="center"|Position
! style="background:maroon; color:white;" scope="col" rowspan="2" width="10%" align="center"|Nation
! style="background:maroon; color:white;" scope="col" rowspan="2" width="20%" align="center"|Name
! style="background:maroon; color:white;" scope="col" colspan="2" align="center"|Totals
! style="background:maroon; color:white;" scope="col" colspan="2" align="center"|Championship
! style="background:maroon; color:white;" scope="col" colspan="2" align="center"|League Cup
! style="background:maroon; color:white;" scope="col" colspan="2" align="center"|Scottish Cup
|-
! style="background:maroon; color:white;" scope="col" width=60 align="center"|Apps
! style="background:maroon; color:white;" scope="col" width=60 align="center"|Goals
! style="background:maroon; color:white;" scope="col" width=60 align="center"|Apps
! style="background:maroon; color:white;" scope="col" width=60 align="center"|Goals
! style="background:maroon; color:white;" scope="col" width=60 align="center"|Apps
! style="background:maroon; color:white;" scope="col" width=60 align="center"|Goals
! style="background:maroon; color:white;" scope="col" width=60 align="center"|Apps
! style="background:maroon; color:white;" scope="col" width=60 align="center"|Goals
|-
|-
  

 

 

 

 

               

   

 

 

 
Appearances (starts and substitute appearances) and goals include those in the Scottish Championship, League Cup and the Scottish Cup.

Disciplinary Record
During the 2020–21 season, Hearts players were issued forty-five yellow cards and one red. The table below shows the number of cards and type shown to each player.
Last updated 30 April 2021

Goal scorers
Last updated 30 April 2021

Clean sheets
{| class="wikitable" style="font-size: 95%; text-align: center;"
|-
! style="background:maroon; color:white;" scope="col" width=60|
! style="background:maroon; color:white;" scope="col" width=60|
! style="background:maroon; color:white;" scope="col" width=60|
! style="background:maroon; color:white;" scope="col" width=150|Name
! style="background:maroon; color:white;" scope="col" width=80|Championship
! style="background:maroon; color:white;" scope="col" width=80|League Cup
! style="background:maroon; color:white;" scope="col" width=80|Scottish Cup
! style="background:maroon; color:white;" scope="col" width=80|Total
|-
|1
|GK
|
|Craig Gordon
|13
|2
|0
|15
|-
|2
|GK
|
|Ross Stewart
|0
|0
|0
|0
|-
! colspan=4 | Total
!13||2||0||15

Team statistics

League table

League Cup table

Division summary

Management statistics
Last updated on 30 April 2021

Club

Staff

Deaths
The following players and people associated with the club died over the course of the season. Former captain Jim Townsend, 2012 Scottish Cup winning captain Marius Zaliukas and former coach Walter Borthwick.

Management
Following football being suspended indefinitely during the previous season due to the COVID-19 pandemic, Manager Daniel Stendel advised the club he would not take any wages during the closed period and returned to Germany. Stendel's contract included a clause which rendered him a free agent should the club be relegated.

Following the vote to end the 2019–20 season and Hearts being relegated on an average points basis,  Stendel's contract was ended, rendering him a Free Agent. Despite Stendel indicating he wished to negotiate a new contract, on 21 June 2020, Hearts appointed Dundee United Manager Robbie Neilson, He had previously managed Hearts between 2014 and 2016 and was awarded a three-year contract. Stendel's assistants Jorg Sievers and Dale Tonge also departed the club. On 12 August 2020, Neilson's former United assistants Gordon Forrest and Lee McCulloch were appointed as First Team Assistant Managers. They joined on a three year deal.

International selection

Over the course of the season a number of the Hearts squad were called up on international duty. Craig Gordon was called up to represent Scotland while Michael Smith and Liam Boyce were selected to represent Northern Ireland.

Awards

SPFL awards

PFA awards

Transfers

Players in

Players out

Loans in

Loans out

See also
List of Heart of Midlothian F.C. seasons

Notes

References

2020-22
Scottish football clubs 2020–21 season